Sarvis is a surname. Notable people with the surname include:

 Mary Alice Sarvis (1914–1965), American psychiatrist and psychoanalyst
 Robert Sarvis (born 1976), American politician
 William Sarvis (1898–1968), Welsh footballer

See also
 Sarvis Creek Wilderness
 Sarvis Fork Covered Bridge